Eastfield Primary School is a state-funded primary school in Kingston upon Hull, East Riding of Yorkshire, England, for pupils aged 4 to 11. 
In 2014, plans were laid out for the school to be demolished in place of a newer building. Construction work began on 19 January 2015.

History
The school was established in 1930 as Eastfield Road School and was reorganised into two schools when a separate junior block was added in 1936; half of this block is now used as an Adult Education Centre. 
Also in 1936, a senior mixed department of 400 places was built, which became Eastfield High School in 1945. 
Eastfield High School was later closed and incorporated into Eastfield Primary School.

References

Primary schools in Kingston upon Hull
Educational institutions established in 1930
1930 establishments in England
Academies in Kingston upon Hull